Global Maritime is an independent offshore and engineering consultancy headquartered in Stavanger, Norway. The company provides engineering, marine and advisory services to the offshore and shipping industry. Originally operating primarily in the North Sea and the Gulf of Mexico, the company has over the recent years expanded its area of operations to include a number of emerging market locations. Global Maritime offers expertise from concept design, construction and operation, through to decommissioning of offshore developments.

History
Global Maritime was founded in London, England in 1979. The Stavanger branch was founded in 1987. After a restructuring in the early 2000s, Global Maritime Holdings AS was established as the enterprise's parent company, and the worldwide headquarters were moved to Stavanger.

Global Maritime was responsible for the 2011 installation of the sole platform on the Prirazlomnoye field in the Pechora Sea. The Prirazlomnoye field is the first commercial oil development in the Arctic.

In 2012, Norwegian investment company HitecVision announced that it had acquired a majority share of the Global Maritime stock.

Operations

Design and Engineering
Global Maritime designs various types of marine vessels and rigs. Among the company's designs is the GM4000, a drilling rig design used by among others COSL for several of their rigs.

Marine Engineering and Consultancy

Marine Operations

Marine Warranty and Asset Integrity Assurance

Risk and Safety

Organization

Global Maritime Holdings AS headquarters are located in Stavanger, Norway.  The company has a further seven European divisions, as well as divisions in the Americas, the Middle East, Asia-Pacific and Africa.

Branches and subsidiaries
 Global Maritime AS
 Stavanger, Norway
 Bergen, Norway
 Ålesund, Norway
 Florø, Norway
 Global Maritime Holdings Ltd.
 Global Maritime Consultancy Ltd.
 London, England
 Hamburg, Germany
 Baku, Azerbaijan
 Aktau, Kazakhstan
 Abu Dhabi, United Arab Emirates
 Cairo, Egypt
 Global Maritime Scotland Ltd.
 Aberdeen, Scotland
 Eagle Lyon Pope Ltd.
 London, England
 American Global Maritime Inc.
 Houston, United States of America
 Halifax, Canada
 Ciudad del Carmen, Mexico
 Global Maritime Ltd.
 Shanghai, China
Global Maritime Pty.
 Singapore City, Singapore
Jakarta, Indonesia
 Kuala Lumpur, Malaysia
Shanghai, China

References 

Energy engineering and contractor companies
International engineering consulting firms